The Lithuanian Women's Cup (Lithuanian: LFF moterų taurė) is the annual cup competition of women's football teams in Lithuania.

Format
In current years the cup is played in two groups. The group winners contest the final.

List of finals
The list of finals: No editions held from 1999 to 2001.

See also
Lithuanian Football Cup, men's equivalent

References

External links
Competition history at futbolinis.lt (Lithuanian)

Lith
Cup
Women